Tab is a district in north-eastern part of Somogy County. Tab is also the name of the town where the district seat is found. The district is located in the Southern Transdanubia Statistical Region.

Geography 
Tab District borders with Siófok District to the north, Tamási District (Tolna County) to the east, Dombóvár District (Tolna County) and Kaposvár District to the south, Fonyód District to the west. The number of the inhabited places in Tab District is 24.

Municipalities 
The district has 1 town and 23 villages.
(ordered by population, as of 1 January 2013)

The bolded municipality is city.

See also
List of cities and towns in Hungary

References

External links
 Postal codes of the Tab District

Districts in Somogy County